The 1999 Swindon Borough Council election took place on 6 May 1999 to elect members of Swindon Unitary Council in Wiltshire, England. One third of the council was up for election and the Labour party stayed in overall control of the council.

After the election, the composition of the council was
Labour: 39
Liberal Democrat: 10
Conservative: 5

Election result
Overall turnout in the election was 25.6%.

References

1999 English local elections
1999
1990s in Wiltshire